The following highways are numbered 1A:

Canada
  Alberta Highway 1A
  British Columbia Highway 1A
  Manitoba Highway 1A
  Route 1A (Prince Edn mm...ward Island)

Germany
 Bundesstraße 1a, a German road

India

New Zealand
  New Zealand State Highway 1A

United States
  U.S. Route 1A
  Delaware Route 1A
  Massachusetts Route 1A
  New Hampshire Route 1A
  New York State Route 1A (former)
  Rhode Island Route 1A
  Secondary State Highway 1A (Washington) (former)

Vietnam
  National Route 1 (Vietnam), also known as National Route 1, a road connecting the northernmost and southernmost areas of the country

See also
mk